Adamstown is the capital of, and the only settlement on, the Pitcairn Islands, the only British Overseas Territory that is located in the Pacific Ocean.

As of January 2020, Adamstown has a population of 47, which is the entire population of the Pitcairn Islands. All the other islands in the group are uninhabited. Adamstown is where most residents live, while they grow food in other areas of the island.

Adamstown is the second smallest capital in the world by population. It has access to television, satellite Internet, and a telephone; however, the main means of communication remains ham radio. The "Hill of Difficulty" connects the island's jetty to the town.

History

The history of the Pitcairn Islands begins with the settlement of the islands by Polynesians in the 11th century. The Polynesians established a culture that flourished for four centuries and then vanished. Pitcairn was settled again in 1790 by a group of British mutineers on HMS Bounty and Tahitians. Adamstown is named for the last surviving mutineer, John Adams.

Geography

The settlement is located on the central-north side of the island of Pitcairn, facing the Pacific Ocean and close to the Bounty Bay, the only seaport of the island.

Climate
Adamstown has a tropical rainforest climate (Af) under the Köppen climate classification system. The hamlet features a wet, very warm climate averaging  of rain a year. The wettest month is December and temperatures do not vary significantly throughout the year.

Personalities

Ned Young (1762–1800)
Fletcher Christian (1764–1793)
John Adams (1768–1829)
Joshua Hill (1773–1844?)
Thursday October Christian (1790–1831)
Steve Christian (b. 1951)
Brenda Christian (b. 1953)
Meralda Warren (b. 1959)

See also
Bounty Bible

Island Council of Pitcairn
Pitcairn sexual assault trial of 2004
List of rulers of the Pitcairn Islands

Notes and references

External links

 
Capitals in Oceania
Geography of the Pitcairn Islands
Populated places established in 1790
Capitals of British Overseas Territories
Populated places in Oceania
1790 establishments in the Pitcairn Islands